LeCras is a surname. Notable people with the surname include:

 Brent LeCras (born 1981), Australian rules football player
 Mark LeCras (born 1986), Australian rules football player